Peng Shuai and Zhang Shuai were the defending champions, however Peng chose not to participate. Zhang partnered with Chuang Chia-jung, but lost in the first round to Anastasia Rodionova and Vera Zvonareva.
Chan Hao-ching and Chan Yung-jan won the title, defeating Shuko Aoyama and Tamarine Tanasugarn in the final, 2–6, 6–4, [10–3].

Seeds

Draw

Draw

References 
 Main Draw

Doubles
PTT Thailand Open - Doubles
 in women's tennis